The impeachment of Martín Vizcarra may refer to:

 First impeachment process against Martín Vizcarra, initiated on September 11, 2020
 Removal of Martín Vizcarra, initiated on October 8, 2020